SPI may refer to:

Organizations
 Indian Protection Service (Serviço de Proteção ao Índio), Brazil
 Shotmed Paper Industries, an Egyptian paper manufacturers 
 Simulations Publications, Inc., a former US board game publisher
 Sony Pictures Imageworks
 Stream Processors, Inc, a semiconductor company
 Sisters of Perpetual Indulgence, an LGBT  group
 Society for Philosophical Inquiry
 Society of the Plastics Industry, a U.S. trade association
 Software in the Public Interest
 Software Patent Institute, US
 St. Pascual Institution, Philippines school
 St. Paul's Institution, a school in Malaysia
 Sustainable Preservation Initiative, of cultural heritage
 Sveriges Pensionärers Intresseparti, or Swedish Senior Citizen Interest Party
 Social Progress Imperative, a US-based nonprofit created in 2012

Computing
 SCSI Parallel Interface
 Serial Peripheral Interface
 Security Parameter Index in IPSec tunneling
 Service provider interface, an API
 Software Process Improvement, of Data & Analysis Center for Software
 System Packet Interface for networking
Stateful Packet Inspection for networking

Other uses
 Single-point injection
 Social Progress Index of countries
 Abraham Lincoln Capital Airport (IATA code), US
 Sediment Profile Imagery underwater
 Spi-calculus, a proposed extension of Π-calculus
 Swiss Performance Index, a stock index

See also
 SPI 200 futures contract, Australian index
 Spy (disambiguation)